Henrik Roger Larsson (born 30 September 1999) is a Swedish sprinter. He won a gold medal in the 100 metres at the 2019 European U23 Championships. Earlier that year he narrowly missed the final at the 2019 European Indoor Championships.

International competitions

1Did not start in the final
2Did not start in the semifinals

Personal bests
Outdoor
100 metres – 10.20 (+1.1 m/s, Skara 2019)
200 metres – 20.81 (+1.0 m/s, Stockholm 2019)

Indoor
60 metres – 6.53 (Istanbul 2023)
200 metres – 21.78 (Rud 1019)

References

1999 births
Living people
Swedish male sprinters
Swedish Athletics Championships winners
21st-century Swedish people